Kalawit, officially the Municipality of Kalawit (Subanen: Benwa Kalawit; Chavacano: Municipalidad de Kalawit), is a 4th class municipality in the province of Zamboanga del Norte, Philippines. According to the 2020 census, it has a population of 23,812 people.

It was created by virtue of Republic Act No. 6851 on February 10, 1990.

Geography

Barangays
Kalawit is politically subdivided into 14 barangays.
 Batayan
 Botong
 Concepcion
 Daniel Maing (Dominolog)
 Fatima (Lacsutan)
 Gatas
 Kalawit (Poblacion)
 Marcelo
 New Calamba
 Palalian
 Paraiso
 Pianon
 San Jose
 Tugop

Climate

Demographics

Economy

References

External links
 Kalawit Profile at PhilAtlas.com
 [ Philippine Standard Geographic Code]
Philippine Census Information

Municipalities of Zamboanga del Norte